Klaus Hurrelmann (born 1944) is professor of public health and education at the Hertie School in Berlin, Germany.

Klaus Hurrelmann was born on 10 January 1944 in Gdynia and studied sociology, psychology and education in Berkeley (USA), Freiburg and Münster.

Biography 
Klaus Hurrelmann first married Bettina Hurrelmann, who later became professor of German studies at the University of Cologne and died in 2015. They have one daughter (Annette Hurrelmann, Deputy Head of Unit, DG Maritime Affairs, European Commission, Brussels, Belgium) and one son (Achim Hurrelmann, professor of political science, Carleton University, Ottawa, Canada). His second marriage is with Doris Schaeffer, professor of public health, nursing and health sciences research at Bielefeld University, who brought one son into the marriage (Merlin Schaeffer, Professor of Sociology, University of Copenhagen, Denmark).

Education 
Hurrelmann studied sociology, psychology, and education at the universities in Münster and Freiburg as well as at the University of California at Berkeley (US). He gained his diploma in sociology in 1968. He was awarded a doctorate in sociology at the University of Münster in 1971 for his work on the social and institutional determinants of education. In 1975, he gained his postdoctoral habilitation at Bielefeld University for work on the educational system and society.

Academic career 
Hurrelmann started his academic career as a research assistant. In 1975, he became professor of education and socialization at the University of Essen. In 1980, he was appointed professor of socialization research at Bielefeld University. Hurrelmann was the first dean of the newly founded Faculty of Educational Science. In 1986, he founded the Collaborative Research Centre “Sonderforschungsbereich Prevention and Intervention in Childhood and Adolescence.” Funded by the German Research Foundation (DFG), this centre was made up of as many as 15 interdisciplinary research teams.
 
In 1993, Hurrelmann switched to the newly founded Faculty of Health Sciences at Bielefeld. He was elected the Founding Dean and was responsible for building up the first School of Public Health in Germany. He took over research in the field of prevention and health promotion. Commissioned by the World Health Organization (WHO), he founded the Collaboration Centre for Child and Adolescent Health Promotion. Until 2012, this Centre coordinated the representative health survey of 11- to 15-year-olds in Germany carried out throughout Europe as part of the Health Behaviour in School-aged Children (HBSC) study. Each assessment wave includes more than 6,000 randomly selected school children from all parts of Germany. From 1996 to 2004, he was also Director of the Institut für Bevölkerungsforschung und Sozialpolitik (Institute for Demographic Research and Social Policy).

In March 2009, Hurrelmann became professor of public health and education at the Hertie School of Governance in Berlin. His main research interest is to develop a comprehensive theory of socialisation, on the theoretical level, and to develop comprehensive intervention strategies for preventing social disadvantage and health impairments in childhood and adolescence, on the empirical research level.

Other activities
 National Council of Prevention, Member of the Scientific Board
 National Action Plan Health Literacy, Board of Editors
 ''Member of the Federal Minister of the Interior's Council of Experts on Demography

Recognition
 2003 – Prize of the Swiss Dr. Margrit Egnér Foundation for his life's work (with an award of 25,000 Swiss francs)
 2018 - Doctor Honoris Causa, Pedagogical University of Freiburg

Research 
The focus of Hurrelmann's research is on transferring socialisation theory to childhood and adolescence, education, and health. The theoretical approach he developed for these research topics does not only influence sociology but also research projects in the field of pedagogy, psychology, health science, and social medicine. He directed several projects on the role family and school conditions play in the development of personality and achievement, the correlation between socialisation and health, and the prevention of risk behavior, especially violence, addiction and psychosomatic health disorders.

Socialisation research 

Central to Hurrelmann's theory of socialisation is the tension between the individual and society. He defines socialisation as the individual's personality development resulting from productively processing internal and external reality. An individual's internal reality is formed by bodily and mental dispositions and traits; the external reality, by the properties of the social and physical environment. The processing of reality is productive because individuals live their lives actively and try to master the developmental tasks they have to face during the entire life course.

Most noted and also often discussed at schools and universities, particularly in pedagogy, social sciences and health sciences, is his “Model of Productive Processing of Reality (PPR)”. The core assumption of this model is that “personality does not form independently from society any of its functions or dimensions but is continuously being shaped, in a concrete, historically conveyed life world, throughout the entire space of the life span”.

The PPR model places the human subject in a social and ecological context that must be absorbed and processed subjectively. The human being as an autonomous subject has the lifelong task to harmonize the processes of social integration and personal individualization. Across the entire life span, individuals master this task in age-appropriate steps matching their level of development. These “developmental tasks” are: education/qualification, attachment/social contacts, consumption/regeneration, and participation/value orientation. In this sense, socialisation consists in a complex “continuous work on one's own personality.” It may succeed, but, under unfavorable conditions, it may also fail. Failure leads to problems with identity, personality, and health.

Childhood, adolescence, and generation research 

Klaus Hurrelmann has concentrated on applying his developmental task concept to the life phases of childhood and adolescence. He identifies the central developmental tasks in infancy and early childhood as gaining a basic emotional trust, developing communication skills and attachment behavior, developing the ability to express oneself verbally, identifying with one's own gender, and building up basic sensory and motor skills. In later childhood from the age of six onward, these tasks are joined by developing female or male role behavior; learning basic skills in reading, writing, and arithmetic; and forming competencies in dealing with the media and leisure time. This approach understands children as autonomous subjects who are productively engaged in shaping their lives.

Hurrelmann conceives adolescence as an autonomous life phase that has inserted itself between childhood and adulthood over the last 100 years. This phase of life generally lasts for about 15 years. Nowadays, it is beginning earlier than ever before in human history, because children reach puberty at an increasingly early age. At the other end, however, adolescence is more open than ever before and has become basically unplannable. This impacts on the mastering of developmental tasks: In the areas of education and qualification the demands are rising; the separation from parents and the development of own attachments are being postponed, and the acquisition of competencies as a consumer, user of media, economic citizen, as well as participation in politics and society are more and more considered as tasks that have to be managed on one's own responsibility. As a consequence, several developmental problems arise. According to Hurrelmann, social background and gender are the main determinants for the successful completion of the developmental tasks to be mastered during this phase of life. In this regard, male adolescents seem to have problems coping with these developmental tasks to an increasing extent.

Drawing on the work of Karl Mannheim, Hurrelmann links this approach to generational research. His aim is to work out how technological, economic, and political events shape personality in generation-specific ways. This reveals how the need to deal permanently with unpredictable futures and uncertain life perspectives is leading to a mentality of tentatively probing and pragmatically testing alternatives in the young generation born between 1985 and 2000. Klaus Hurrelmann calls these members of the current young generation, which he also labels “Generation Y,” “ego tacticians.” Recently, research on the youngest generation, born between 2000 and 2015, has been initiated. These young people are usually called "Generation Z". Hurrelmann argues for the nomination "Generation Greta", because of the high influence of the Swedish climate activist Greta Thunberg on attitudes and behaviour of the "Post-Millennials".

His theoretical approaches to adolescence have been applied in many empirical studies. Alongside the Collaborative Research Centre “Prevention and Intervention in Childhood and Adolescence,” these particularly include the Shell Youth Studies. Klaus Hurrelmann designed the new generation of Shell Youth Studies that have been carried out since 2002 together with the Infratest-Kantar social research institute. Recently, these have been joined by studies on vocational training and career choices in youth and on future pensions and finances of adolescents and young adults.

Educational research 

Klaus Hurrelmann's work in educational research focuses on how the starting conditions in families along with the way schools are organized determine academic success and failure. He uses his socialisation theory to explain this in terms of differences in the guidance and support given by parents.

Klaus Hurrelmann's studies show how the design of the school system in Germany and the teaching process also contribute to the poor performance of children from families with low socioeconomic status. The early tracking of students into the three-tier system of Hauptschule, Realschule, and Gymnasium following elementary school systematically disadvantages children who receive little encouragement to learn in their families. Ever since the 1970s, Klaus Hurrelmann has been calling for Hauptschule, Realschule, and comprehensive schools to be merged into one type of integrated school with its own senior classes oriented toward the labor market and careers that will offer an educational alternative to the academic Gymnasium. This should reduce the pressure on parents and children to decide on the future course of education at the young age of 10 years. All school-leaving qualifications should be possible at both types of school. This approach, which he calls the “two-path model,” was introduced in the East German federal states in 1989/90 following the unification of the two Germanys. Since then, many West German federal states have also adopted this reform.

Klaus Hurrelmann emphasizes the need to promote both achievement-related and social competencies in all educational institutes. An important element of such approaches is to integrate the promotion of exercise, good nutrition, and relaxation techniques in school curricula to help children and adolescents to master their age-specific developmental tasks. Klaus Hurrelmann also calls for parents and professional childcare and teaching personnel to cooperate intensively in negotiating their different childrearing concepts. He bases this approach on a “Magical childrearing triangle” with the three poles “Recognition”, “Encouragement”, and “Guidance”. He also supports compulsory parent training and favors the introduction of a symbolic “parenting license.”

Health research 

Klaus Hurrelmann's work in health research focuses on the interface between the sociology of health and health education. He has taken a leading role in this field.

His definition of health has been very influential: “Health denotes the state of well-being in individuals when their mental and social situation matches their potentials and goals within the specifically given external living conditions.” Health is accordingly the state of balance between risk and protective factors that emerges when an individual succeeds in mastering both internal (bodily and mental) and external (social and material) demands. It grants the individual well-being and vitality. This definition is now being viewed as a further development of the traditional definition of health from the World Health Organization (WHO). It is being applied in many disciplines within the health sciences.

An important line of research for Klaus Hurrelmann is prevention and health promotion. Many of his research projects have focused on the social determinants of health and illness in children and adolescents. They show how the social inequality among children and adolescents also extends to health. They focus particularly on analyzing the health-related behavior of children and adolescents.

Publications (selection)

Textbooks in English 
 Developmental Tasks in Adolescence (2019). London/New York: Routledge, 
 Social Structure and Personality Development (2009). New York. Cambridge University Press, 
 Human Development and Health (1989). New York. Springer, 
 Socialisation During the Life Course(2018). Milton Park: Routledge, 
 Gen Z Between Climate Crisis and Coronavirus Pandemic (2021). London/New York: Routledge,

Handbooks/Readers in English 
 Social Networks and Social Support in Childhood and Adolescence (1994). Berlin/New York: De Gruyter, 
 Social Problems and Social Contexts in Adolescence (1996). New York: Aldine, 
 Health Hazards in Adolescence (1990). Berlin/New York: De Gruyter, 
 Health Risks and Developmental Transitions during Adolescence (1997). New York: Cambridge University Press, 
 Individualization in Childhood and Adolescence (1996). Berlin/New York: De Gruyter, 
 International Handbook of Public Health (1996). Westport: Greenwood Publishers, 
 International Handbook of Adolescence (1994). Westport: Greenwood Publishers,

References

External links 
 Homepage at the Hertie School of Governance
 List of Publications
 Detailed Biography at the University of Bielefeld
 Hertie Berlin Studie
 Klaus Hurrelmann in the Media

1944 births
Living people
People from Gdynia
German public health doctors
Academic staff of Hertie School